Robert Fulton (1765–1815) was an American inventor.

Robert Fulton may also refer to:

Robert L. Fulton (1847–1920), railroad agent and newspaper publisher in Reno, Nevada
Robert Burwell Fulton (1849–1919), American university administrator
Bertie Fulton (Robert Patrick Fulton, 1906–1979), amateur footballer from Northern Ireland
Robert Edison Fulton Jr. (1909–2004), American inventor and adventurer
Robert B. Fulton (1910–2015), U.S. Navy admiral
Rikki Fulton (Robert Kerr Fulton, 1924–2004), Scottish comedian and actor
Robert D. Fulton (born 1929), Governor of Iowa
Bob Fulton (1947–2021), Australian rugby league player
Robert Fulton (Royal Marines officer) (born 1948), former British Governor of Gibraltar
Robert J. Fulton (1826–1895), American Jesuit educator and president of Boston College

Other uses 
Bobby Fulton (James Hines, born 1960), American wrestler
Robert Fulton Birthplace, a stone house in Pennsylvania
Robert Fulton (Roberts), a 1889 sculpture depicting the American inventor